Elmer Fisk Banker (July 19, 1871 – June 24, 1939) was an American politician in the state of Washington. He served in the Washington House of Representatives from 1917 to 1933.

References

Democratic Party members of the Washington House of Representatives
1871 births
1939 deaths